Barrankula is a small village in Nagayalanka mandal, Krishna district, Andhra Pradesh. This villages comes under Ganapeswarum Panchayat. The population is about 2,000.
Gosala was constructed in 2017, and was named Gopala Gokulam Gosewa Trust. It was founded by Thota suresh Babu, who is also founder of Hindhu Devalya Parirakshna Trust (HDPT). The temples in the village are named:

1. Sri Anjaneya Swamy Temple 

2. Sri Seetha Ramachandra swamy Temple 

3. Ganganamma Temple (Village god)

4. Sri Urumulamma Temple

5. Sri Nagendrasway Temple 

6. Sri Pothuraju Swamy Temple

Arts and culture 

 Vijayadashami, Ganesh Chaturthi, Diwali, Hanuman Jayanti, Sri Ramanavami, Makara Sankranthi, and Ugadh celebrations are very popular in this village. There are many Christians are there in the village, and they celebrate Christmas every year. Religiously significant places include Uruvulamma temple, Sriram temple, and Hanuman temple.
In this village all are Pawan Kalyan fans all young stars support Jana Sena Party.
https://www.janasenaparty.org/
For janasena party donations https://janasenaparty.org/donations

References 

Villages in Krishna district